Thoth is a documentary film by Sarah Kernochan and Lynn Appelle about the life of New York-based street performer S. K. Thoth. In 2002, the film won the Oscar for Best Documentary Short Subject at the 74th Academy Awards.

Awards and nominations

See also

List of documentary films
List of American films of 2001

References

External links

Thoth at Direct Cinema

2001 films
2001 short documentary films
American short documentary films
Best Documentary Short Subject Academy Award winners
American independent films
Documentary films about entertainers
Films shot in New York City
2001 independent films
2000s English-language films
2000s American films